Van Halen is the debut studio album by American rock band Van Halen. Released on February 10, 1978, Van Halen was a major commercial success. The album peaked at number 19 on the US Billboard 200 and has sold more than 10 million copies in the United States. Van Halen received diamond certification by the RIAA and was received well by the general public making it one the best-selling albums in the United States.

The album contains some of the band's most well-known songs, including "Runnin' with the Devil", "Ain't Talkin' 'bout Love", "Jamie's Cryin'", their cover version of the Kinks "You Really Got Me", and the instrumental "Eruption"; played and written by guitarist Eddie Van Halen, it is widely regarded as one of the greatest guitar solos of all time and helped popularize two-handed tapping.

Background
Van Halen began recording demos in 1976. However, a three-track tape financed by Gene Simmons attracted no interest from record labels. Guitarist Eddie Van Halen was not convinced of the quality of the material because they could not make the recordings with their own equipment. Simmons left to tour with Kiss after recording the demos, but said he would try to secure Van Halen a record deal afterwards.

After recording the demos, the band was offered several concerts. At a sold-out show in their hometown, Pasadena, the group's future manager, Marshall Berle, discovered the band. He and musical entrepreneur Kim Fowley paired them with punk rock band Venus and the Razorblades for a gig at the Whisky a Go Go. After being well received by Berle at the Whisky a Go Go, the band gained the attention of Mo Ostin and Ted Templeman of Warner Bros. Ostin and Templeman were impressed with the band's subsequent performance at the Starwood, and Van Halen proceeded to sign a contract with Warner. The recording of their debut album began August 29, 1977 and lasted three weeks. With producer Ted Templeman, it was mostly recorded live. "Runnin' with the Devil", "Jamie's Cryin'", "Feel Your Love Tonight" and "Ice Cream Man" contain guitar overdubs. Overall, the album cost approximately $40,000 to produce.

"We didn't have a ton of material," recalled bassist Michael Anthony, "so we basically just took our live show and all the songs we knew and went for it. The whole album only took a couple of weeks. Ted Templeman wanted to make a big, powerful guitar record, and he had all he needed in what Eddie was doing."

The subsequent tour began with the band opening for rock acts such as Journey and Montrose in the United States. They later opened for heavy metal band Black Sabbath in Europe and the United States.

Packaging and artwork
The cover photos for Van Halen were taken at the Whisky a Go Go, a Los Angeles club at which Van Halen often performed during the mid-1970s. The guitar pictured on the cover is Eddie Van Halen's signature Frankenstrat (before he added the red paint), a highly customized Stratocaster-style guitar built out of replacement parts.

The liner notes thank radio host disk jockey Rodney Bingenheimer and Kiss bassist Gene Simmons, the latter usually credited with discovering Van Halen. "A lot of people stick me on their [thanks list], even though I don't deserve it," Simmons remarked. "One that I did deserve to be on was that first Van Halen record – the guys still owe me a couple thousand bucks! But I love 'em."

Release and reception

In the United States, Van Halen reached number 19 on the Billboard Top 200; their debut single, a cover of The Kinks' "You Really Got Me", spent three weeks on the chart, peaking at number 36.

Soon after its February 1978 release, Van Halen became regarded by fans and critics as one of rock and roll's greatest debut albums; however, its initial critical reception was mostly negative. In 1978, Rolling Stone critic Charles M. Young predicted, "In three years, Van Halen is going to be fat and self-indulgent and disgusting ... follow[ing] Deep Purple and Led Zeppelin right into the toilet. In the meantime, they are likely to be a big deal." But he also wrote that: "Van Halen's secret is not doing anything that's original while having the hormones to do it better than all those bands who have become fat and self-indulgent and disgusting. Edward Van Halen has mastered the art of lead/rhythm guitar in the tradition of Jimmy Page and Joe Walsh; several riffs on this record beat anything Aerosmith has come up with in years. Vocalist Dave Lee Roth manages the rare hard-rock feat of infusing the largely forgettable lyrics with energy and not sounding like a castrato at the same time. Drummer Alex Van Halen and bassist Michael Anthony are competent and properly unobtrusive." Village Voice critic Robert Christgau said, "For some reason Warners wants us to know that this is the biggest bar band in the San Fernando Valley ... The term becomes honorific when the music belongs in a bar. This music belongs on an aircraft carrier."

According to Rolling Stones Holly George-Warren, with the album's release the mainstream media focused on Roth's "swaggering good looks and extroverted persona", while fans and musicians "were riveted by Eddie Van Halen's guitar mastery", which included "an array of unorthodox techniques." She notes that, even before the band's debut, "Eddie became a legend among local guitarists."

Kerrang! magazine gave the album a very positive review, and considers the album to be an "essential purchase." They wrote, "IT'S DIFFICULT to overstate the effect VH's debut had upon its release. With the music world split between punk, disco and prog rock, Van Halen combined a dazzling live show with a party-hearty motto and, in Eddie Van Halen, a guitarist who redefined what was possible on six strings. His sound on this album—christened 'The Brown Sound'—remains the holy grail of guitar tones."

Record World called the single "Jamie's Crying" a "driving rhythm piece, which may be [Van Halen's] most interesting single to date." saying that "its rock energy never lets up."

Commercial performance
On August 7, 1996, Van Halen was re-certified by the RIAA for selling ten million copies in the United States alone. One of only six rock bands to release two RIAA Diamond status albums, Van Halen remains one of Van Halen's two best-selling albums, along with 1984.

Van Halen went to Gold status on May 24, 1978, and then went to Platinum status just a few months later, on October 10, 1978. In less than a year the album sold more than one million copies in the US alone, meaning that the album was already a great success. On October 22, 1984, the album went to 5× Multi-Platinum status. The album went to 6x Multi-Platinum on February 1, 1989, and then went to 7× Multi-Platinum on September 29, 1993. In less than a year later, on July 11, 1994, the album went to 8x Multi-Platinum, and finally, on August 7, 1996, just two years later, the album went to Diamond status by RIAA.

The Van Halen album, like Van Halen's other David Lee Roth-era albums—excepting Van Halen II, which was re-certified in 2004, to coincide with the promotion of a Warner Bros. Records greatest hits collection—was last brought by Warner Bros. Records to the RIAA for re-certification in 1996, while 1984 was re-certified on February 8, 1999. The band's split with Warner Brothers in 2002, and subsequent agreement with Interscope has eliminated Warner Brothers' incentive for paying the [relatively substantial] fee to promote Van Halen's back-catalog by having its albums re-certified. Despite lack of re-certification, Van Halen's 1978 debut has continued to sell prolifically, re-appearing numerous times on the Billboard 200 and Billboard Top Pop Catalog Albums charts, as recently as 2020.

Legacy
AllMusic's Stephen Thomas Erlewine described Van Halen as "monumental" and "seismic", while noting that it is typically not viewed as an "epochal generation shift" in the same way as the debut albums of Led Zeppelin, the Ramones, The Rolling Stones, and the Sex Pistols. He explains, "The reason it's never given the same due is that there's no pretension, nothing self-conscious about it." He commented: "The still-amazing thing about Van Halen is how it sounds like it has no fathers ... Like all great originals Van Halen doesn't seem to belong to the past and it still sounds like little else, despite generations of copycats." In Erlewine's opinion, the album "set the template for how rock and roll sounded for the next decade or more." A retrospective review by Q noted, "Hit singles came later, but this dazzling debut remains their trump card."

In 1994, Van Halen was ranked number eight in Colin Larkin's Top 50 Heavy Metal Albums. Larkin described it as "one of the truly great" debut albums of heavy metal. According to authors Gary Graff and Daniel Durchholz, writing in MusicHound Rock: The Essential Album Guide (1999), Van Halen is a "headbanger's paradise"; before its release, "no one had heard or seen anything like it." In 2003, Rolling Stone, listed it among The 500 Greatest Albums of All Time, at number 410; the list's 2012 edition had it ranked 415th. The 2020 list placed it at 292. According to Rolling Stones Joe Levy, the album "gave the world a new guitar hero and charismatic frontman" in Eddie Van Halen and David Lee Roth, respectively. Levy credits the tracks "Runnin' with the Devil" and "Ain't Talkin' 'Bout Love" with "put[ting] the swagger back in hard rock", praising Eddie Van Halen's "jaw-dropping technique", which "raised the bar for rock guitar." In 2006, Guitar World readers ranked it number 7 on a list of the Greatest Guitar Albums of All Time. In 2013, Rolling Stone listed the album at number 27 of the 100 Best Debut Albums of All Time.

On April 15, 2013, David Lee Roth was interviewed by Jay Mohr for his podcast, where he selected the album as his favorite Van Halen recording.

Track listing

Personnel

Van Halen 
David Lee Roth – lead vocals, acoustic guitar on "Ice Cream Man" (credited as "David Roth")
Eddie Van Halen – guitar, backing vocals, electric sitar on "Ain't Talkin' 'bout Love"
Michael Anthony – bass, backing vocals
Alex Van Halen – drums

Production 
Dave Bhang – art direction and design
Jodi Cohen – typesetting
Elliot Gilbert – photography
Logan Jervis – engineer
Donn Landee – engineer
Peggy McCreary – engineer
Jo Motta – project coordinator
Kent Nebergall – engineer
Ted Templeman – producer

Charts

Weekly charts

Year-end charts

Singles
(United States)

Certifications

See also
Van Halen discography

References

Works cited

Further reading

Album chart usages for Billboard200
1978 debut albums
Albums produced by Ted Templeman
Albums recorded at Sunset Sound Recorders
Van Halen albums
Warner Records albums